Haara Kotiya is a 2017 Sri Lankan mystery thriller teledrama broadcast on Swarnavahini. The series is produced by Jayaprakash Sivagurunathan and written by Saddha Mangala Sooriyabandara. It aired every weekday from 6:30pm to 7pm and then 9pm to 9:30pm onwards. The series was ended on 1 January 2018 at 9pm.

In season 1, it stars Saranga Disasekara, Ruwan Perera and newcomer Dinithi Walgamage in lead roles along with Rohan Wijetunga and Suraj Mapa in supportive roles. In season 2, this serial continued with newcomer actress Thushini Fernando. The show became a popular and was nominated for Sumathi Awards and Raigam Tele'es in many award categories.

Haara kotiya 2, titled as Kotipathiyo was started on 2 January 2018 and finished on 8 March 2019.

Seasons

Plot

Two unemployed friends, Lara and Dinka, live in a slum near a city. Their fates are changed when two men throw a bag. The news that a bank was robbed and the suspects arrested spreads fast. It is revealed that the money is still missing. Lara and Dinka find the bag thrown by the men and take it to their home in secret. They find out that the bag contains 400 million rupees. The duo hide the money in various places, but decides not to use any of it until the news of the robbery dies down.

Meanwhile, Lara meets a wealthy girl, Abhisheka girl and they become friends. Lara introduces himself as Lala. As this happens, a pick-pocket, Chamiya was shot dead at a robbery and his mentor Ranjith "Ranji" is criticized by everyone. Ranji realises that Lara and Dinka have a secret and follows them. The police also find money in the slum. Lara learns that the stolen money was actually a property of Abhisheka's father, Victor Dunuwila. Ranji falls in love with Lara's widowed sister, Aruni.

The robbers are released and the head robber appears as Napoleon, a mastermind thug. Napoleon also starts to find his money and reveals that someone in the slum had taken the money and hidden it. He kidnaps Ranji and follows him to search other young ones in the slum. Ranji reveals that Dinka and Lara took the robbed money and joins them to share it equally. The trio start to share money and only Ranji got money at the time where police revealed the truth. Lara and Dinka are arrested and the truth about the money is revealed. With the news spreading in the slum, Ranji picks money and is shot. The police finds that money is counterfeit.

Abhisheka realizes Lara's truth and hates him. Her boyfriend, Dilan starts a wrath with Lara. Lara learns that Dilan and Napoleon are partners and Dilan is the main body behind the robbery. Lara escapes from thugs and tries to save Abhisheka. Police find fake money in Abhisheka's home and arrest her father. Dilan engages with Abhisheka while Napoleon flirts with Abhisheka's friend Rashmi. Lara kidnaps Abhisheka and hides her until he convinces her about the truth of Dilan. Abhisheka escapes and flees. Lara kidnaps Dilan and his two men. Abhisheka tells the truth that Lara kidnapped her and hid in their place. Police unsuccessfully search for Lara and crew. By using Dilan's phone, Dinka tell the truth of Dilan and his secret agent in Abhisheka's house. Later, Abhisheka and Rashmi found that Manoja, the servant girl, is the undercover agent of Dilan. So the police go to the house, so Manoja flees. Without news from Dilan, Victor and the police track Lara and crew. Dinka asks Abhisheka to come and meet her. Rashmi tells the news to Napoleon and Napoleon sends his gang to rescue them and seize Lara and crew. At the Dilan's house, Napoleon's gang and Lara's gang have a shootout and Napoleon's man fell down. Then the crew retreated and meanwhile Dilan escaped by threatening Lara. Dilan captures Abhisheka and Dilan reveals his truth to them. While escaping, Dilan shot at Abhisheka, injuring her. Dilan escapes and hides under Napoleon's protection.

Abhisheka soon realises that Lara loves her. She also turns to her, but Lara started to reject her stating their family backgrounds are not equal. Meanwhile, Dilan started to kill Lara and Napoleon. Rashmi flirts with Napoleon, but he rejects her. After healing, Abhisheka secretly meets Lara to tell him that she loves him. But at that moment, Dilan appears and shoots at Lara. However, at the fight, one of Napoleon's henchmen shot Dilan and escapes. the police arrive and arrest Lara and Ranji. Abhisheka is disappointed by Lara's response and went abroad with her family. Dili also flees from the slum. In the end credits, it is revealed that Dinka masterminded the scenes. He faked his friends and secretly kept the money. He also produced the counterfeit money and blamed Abhisheka's father.

6 months later

Lara and Ranji are released. Underworld don, Dharman, hires them to kill a journalist, Kavishan Perera. Lara and Ranji refuse, angering Dharman. Kavishan is killed by Dharman's henchmen. Lara kills the shooter and flees with Kavishan's fiancée, Anjali, from Dharman and Minister Mothilal Caldera, who masterminded Kavishan's death. Anjali promises to avenge them and hides in Lara and Ranji's slum.

After Abhisheka went abroad, Lara alone protects Anjali from the thugs and the minister. Ranji sees their old friend Dinka in a store and informs Lara and they seek vengeance for the money heist. After some fights and arguments, Dinka befriends Lara and Ranji. Caldera's daughter Parami returns. Lara and Parami become friends. During a fight in slum, Anjali fatally shoots Caldera, having injuries on herself. Parami has Anjali arrested. Anjali returns and befriends with Dharman's son, Bhathiya. Bhathiya is paralyzed and Anjali takes care of him. Lara meets Abhisheka, who now suffers from a brain tumor. Abhisheka refuses to reunite with him and Lara donates money to Abhisheka's operation. Eventually, Abhisheka recovers and reunites with Lara.

Ranji marries Aruni. Dharman reforms, but is killed during a battle with the police. Anjali abandons her criminal ways. She is caught after her landlord, Piyatissa complains about her. Anjali is fatally shot during a fight, saddening Lara and Dinka. Parami emigrates. Finally, Lara and Dinka move back to their old age slum stories.

Cast

Main
 Saranga Disasekara as Lara Kumara – Norbert's son; Aruni's brother; Dinka and Ranji's friend; Abhisheka's love interest-turned-husband
 Rohan Wijetunge as K. G. Supun Ranjith aka Ranji – Kamala's son; Chamiya's former partner; Lara and Dinka's friend; Aruni's second husband
 Ruwan Perera as Dinka – Lara and Ranji's friend
 Thushini Fernando as Anjali – Kavishan's fiancée; Caldera's murderer (dead)
 Roshan Pilapitiya as Minister Mothilal Caldera – Mastermind behind Kavishan's death; Sarojani's husband; Parami's father (dead)
 Chami Senanayake as Dharman – Underworld don; Dulani's husband; Bhathiya and Hiruni's father (dead)
 Senali Fonseka as Dili – Piyatissa and Ambatenne's daughter; Lara's friend, Chamiya's sister
 Suraj Mapa as Nepolion – Main thief at the bank robbery; Rashmi's love interest
 Dinithi Walgamage as Abhisheka Dunuwila – Victor and Manel's elder daughter; Dinithi's sister; Lara's love interest-turned-wife

Supportive cast
 Ananda Athukorale as Norbert – Lara and Aruni's father
 Nirosha Thalagala as Aruni Kumari – Norbert's daughter; Lara's sister; Ranji's wife; Doni's mother
 Shalani Tharaka as Parami Caldera – Caldera and Sarojini's daughter; Lara's wife
 Sanju Rodrigo as Sarojani Caldera – Caldera's wife; Parami's mother
 Shiromika Fernando as Pushpalatha aka Sudu – Piyatissa's second wife; Shalitha's mother
 Malkanthi Jayasinghe as Ambatanne – Piyatissa's ex-wife; Dili's mother 
 Upatissa Balasuriya as Piyatissa – Ambatanne's ex-husband; Sudu's husband; Dili and Shalitha's father
 Sharad Chanduma as Shalitha – Piyatissa and Sudu's son
 Dinesh Silva as Bhathiya aka Bhathi – Dharman and Dulani's son; Hiruni's brother; Anjali's friend
 Hashinika Karaliyadde as Dulani – Dharman's wife; Bhathiya and Hiruni's mother
 Wageesha Salgadu as Hiruni – Dharman and Dulani's daughter; Bhathiya's sister
 Eardley Wedamuni as Victor Dunuwila – Owner of 400 million; Manel's husband; Abhisheka and Dinithi's father
 Sangeetha Basnayake as Manel Dunuwila – Victor's wife; Abhisheka and Dinithi's mother
 Lankika Mathotaarachchi as Dinithi Dunuwila – Victor and Manel's younger daughter; Abhisheka's sister
 Sandani Fernando as Rashmi – Abhisheka's friend; Napoleon's love interest
 Janvi Apsara as Doni – Aruni's daughter
 Sudharshani Gelanigama as Kamala, Ranji's mother
 Sanketh Wickramage as Kavishan Perera – Journalist; Anjali's fiancé (dead)
 Anjana Premaratne as DIG
 Dayasiri Hettiarachchi as Police Constable Vithanage
 Geethika Rajapakse as Minister's secretary 
 Rukshana Dissanayake as Madhuka – Ranji and Kamala's tenant
 Dimuthu Chinthaka as Piyasiri Appuhami
 Chirantha Ranwala as Nuwan – newspaper editor
 Gavindha Nawarathne as Dilan – Napoleon's partner; Abhisheka's former love interest (dead)

Minor cast
 Nilukshi Madushika as Bashi (emigrated)
 Kasun Chamara as Chamiya (dead)
 Giriraj Kaushalya (dead)
 Maureen Charuni as Anjali's mother
 Wasantha Kumarasiri as Anjali's father
 Dilum Buddhika as Ranji's slum friend
 Nethalie Nanayakkara as Granny at slum
 Manoj Yalegama as Rathu mudalali
 Ranjan Sooriyakumara as Napoleon's henchman
 Rajasinghe Loluwagoda as Napoleon's henchman
 Udaya Shantha Liyanage as Sub Inspector
 Umeshi Wickramasinghe as Manoja, Dilan's agent in Dunuwila house
 Saman Dharmawansha
 Samudura Premawardhana
 Supun Abeysinghe as himself, dance teacher
 Damith Dilshan
 Ishan Dhanushaka
 Lakshitha Perera
 Anil Chandralal
 Pramila Warnakulasuriya

Critical response
Despite being usual romantic television serials made by Sivagurunathan, the plot of Haara Kotiya expressed beyond those expectations. The series has been shot around slums and towns around Rajagiriya. The story deals with life in the slums and its related complications. However, the plot also explains the love between different levels and journey to become rich and wealth. This changed plot and acting credentials by the actors gave the drama to become one of the most popular television serials in the Sri Lanka. The title song Heena Thibunata Kotiyak by Shyamen Dangamuwa became a popular hit as well.

Accolades

References 

Sri Lankan television shows
Swarnavahini original programming